The 2014 Tour of Qatar was the 13th edition of the Tour of Qatar cycling stage race. It was rated as a 2.HC event on the UCI Asia Tour, and was held between 9 and 14 February 2014, in Qatar.

The race was won by  rider Niki Terpstra, who won the opening stage of the race and held the lead throughout. Second place went to his teammate Tom Boonen, who won two stages and the points classification, while third place went to Jürgen Roelandts of the  squad.

Teams
Nineteen teams competed in the 2014 Tour of Qatar. These included thirteen UCI World Tour teams, five UCI Professional Continental teams and the Skydive Dubai Pro Cycling Team.

The teams that participated in the race were:

Race overview

Stages

Stage 1
9 February 2014 – Al Wakra to Dukhan Beach,

Stage 2
10 February 2014 – Camel Race Track to Al Khor Corniche,

Stage 3
11 February 2014 – Lusail Circuit, individual time trial (ITT)

Stage 4
12 February 2014 – Dukhan Beach to Mesaieed,

Stage 5
13 February 2014 – Al Zubara Fort to Madinat ash Shamal,

Stage 6
14 February 2014 – Sealine Beach Resort to Doha Corniche,

Classification leadership table

References

External links

Tour of Qatar
Tour of Qatar
Tour of Qatar
2014